Stocking Pelham is a village and civil parish in the East Hertfordshire district of Hertfordshire, England. It is located on the border with Essex, around 6 miles (10 km) east of Buntingford.The village is one of the three Pelhams, along with the nearby Brent Pelham and Furneux Pelham.  Stocking Pelham is home to St. Mary's Church in the Church of England Diocese of St Albans. The aerial view of Stocking Pelham shows that the settlements are sparsely positioned from one another.  Close by the village is a major electrical substation of the National Grid.

Population 
Stocking Pelham had a population of 163 according to the 2001 census and the total population was also 163 in 2011.  Historically speaking, much of Stocking Pelham was rather heavily dependent on agriculture for income and in some cases this is still apparent.  Considering the nature of the environment this may explain why there are now many retired citizens residing here.

History 
In the 1870s the location of Stocking Pelham was described as:"a parish in Bishops-Stortford district, Herts; adjacent to Essex, 5¼ miles N W of Stanstead r. station, and 6 miles E of Buntingford."The 1881 Occupational Structure of Stocking Pelham is illustrated in a pie chart below. The chart shows that 46% of the residents at the time were employed in the agricultural sector, hence there was a clear reliance on agricultural labour. In fact, Stocking Pelham was almost completely dependent on primary sector labour with a small fraction of 5%  working in 'Professional Labour'. Although, the 2011 Occupational Structure of Stocking Pelham, also depicted in a pie chart below, in accordance to Neighbourhood Statistics shows that since the 19th century, Stocking Pelham has since broke from its dependence on primary sector labour. In comparison to the 1881 Occupational Structure, citizens are no longer heavily dependent on agricultural labour as a means of income and are now harbouring a more diversely skilled workforce, of which 26% are employed in professional occupations and 19.5% are employed as managers, directors and senior officials. The remaining 54.5% of the workforce are reported to be working within the tertiary and secondary sectors.

St. Mary's Church
St. Mary's Church has a tiled chancel roof and a nave which date back to around 1360.  In either the late 14th or the early 15th century, a narrow isle was added which required a widened nave. Both the eastern and southern walls of the chancel were re-built in brick in the 19th century.

Notoriety
The village is notorious for its association with both the kidnap and murder of Muriel McKay and being the home of Christopher Docherty-Puncheon, who shot Lieutenant Colonel Robert Workman, on his doorstep in nearby Furneux Pelham, Hertfordshire, in an "execution-style" killing in 2004.

See also
The Hundred Parishes

References

External links
Photograph of the Cock, 1996

Villages in Hertfordshire
Civil parishes in Hertfordshire
East Hertfordshire District